Choré may refer to

Locations
 Choré District, Paraguay
 Choré River, Bolivia

Other
 Club Choré Central, a Paraguayan football club